Ljubiša Tumbaković (born 2 September 1952) is a Serbian professional football manager.

He is the most successful coach in the history of Serbian powerhouse Partizan which he led to six national championship titles and three national cup wins during his two spells at the club between 1993 and 2001.

He was most recently the manager of the Serbia national team.

Playing career
Born in Belgrade's urban neighborhood of Dorćol, Tumbaković started out in the youth categories of Radnički Beograd in 1962. Two years later, he joined the youth ranks of Partizan Belgrade. In 1970, with Tumbaković turning 18, he joined the senior squad. Although he didn't appear in any domestic league matches for Partizan, he did appear in 45 friendlies, scoring 6 goals.

Managerial career

Partizan
Tumbaković started his management career with Partizan Belgrade in 1992. Partizan were in the doldrums when Tumbaković took control, however he immediately brought success to Partizan by winning the league with them in his debut season. This was a feat that he would repeat five times during his first time with Partizan as well as winning three Yugoslav Cups. These achievements caught the eye of AEK Athens F.C. who finished third in the league under Tumbaković's management.

Return to Partizan
Tumbaković returned to Partizan at the beginning of the 2000/01 league season after a season away from the club and with the NATO attacks on Yugoslavia firmly behind the league, Tumbaković would continue establishing Partizan as one of the strongest teams in the league. However, despite more domestic success with Partizan where they won the 2001/02 league title European success was far more difficult to achieve. He would stand down from his position after almost a decade in charge of FK Partizan where he was one of the most successful coaches in Yugoslavian football history.

Shandong Luneng
In 2003, he would coach Saudi football team Al-Nasr for a short period. However, he quickly moved to Chinese football team Shandong Luneng at the beginning of their 2004 league season. Tumbaković who was the second Serbian to manage Shandong after Slobodan Santrač, was to make a quick impression at the club when he won the Chinese FA Cup and took them second in league. Ljubiša would continue to establish Shandong as genuine title contenders throughout the 2005 league season despite them coming third within the league and being unable to retain their FA Cup. It was within the 2006 league season which established Shandong as a significant force within the Chinese Super League when they won the league by 17 points and FA cup. Their dominance was repeated when they again won the league title in 2008.

Montenegro
Tumbaković was appointed head coach of the Montenegrin national team on 19 January 2016 and was sacked on 7 June 2019 after refusing to take charge of a UEFA Euro 2020 qualifying game against Kosovo and abandoning the staff on the match day.

Serbia
He was appointed as the manager of the Serbian national team on 1 July 2019. He left the position in December 2020 after not qualifying for Euro 2020, spectacularly failing against Scotland on penalties.

Managerial statistics
Only league games are counted

Honours

Manager
Partizan
 FR Yugoslavia First League (6): 1992–93, 1993–94, 1995–96, 1996–97, 1998–99, 2001–02
 FR Yugoslavia Cup (3): 1993–94, 1997–98, 2000–01 
Shandong Luneng
 Chinese Super League (2): 2006, 2008
 Chinese FA Cup (2): 2004, 2006

Individual
 Serbian Coach of the Year: 2006

References

1952 births
Living people
Sportspeople from Belgrade
Yugoslav footballers
FK Partizan players
FK Vardar players
FK Radnički Sombor players
Association football midfielders
Serbian football managers
FK Obilić managers
FK Partizan managers
AEK Athens F.C. managers
Al Nassr FC managers
Shandong Taishan F.C. managers
Montenegro national football team managers
Serbian expatriate football managers
Expatriate football managers in Greece
Expatriate football managers in China
Expatriate football managers in Iran
Wuhan F.C. managers
Chinese Super League managers